Joseph Berry, Joseph Barry, and other variations may refer to:

Sports
Joe Barry (born 1970), American football coach
Joe Berry (catcher) (1872–1961), American baseball player
Joe Berry (pitcher) (1904–1958), American baseball player
Joe Barry (polo), American polo player
Joe Berry (second baseman) (1894–1976), American baseball player
Joe Berry (rugby league) (born 1974), British rugby league footballer
Joseph Berry (cricketer) (1829–1894), English cricketer
Joe Barry (rugby union), South African rugby union player

Others
Joe Barry (singer) (1939–2004), American singer
Joseph Barry (born 1940), American real estate developer
Joe Barry (director-general) (1932–2022), Director-General of RTÉ
Joseph Berry (RAF officer) (1920–1944), English fighter pilot
Joseph Flintoft Berry (1856–1931), Canadian-born bishop of the Methodist Episcopalian Church

See also
Joel Berry II (born 1995), American basketball player
Joseph Berryer (1897—1978), Belgian diplomat
Joe Barry Carroll, American basketball player
Joseph Perry (disambiguation)